Víctor Giordani (born 22 January 1951) is a Guatemalan sports shooter. He competed in the men's 50 metre running target event at the 1976 Summer Olympics.

References

1951 births
Living people
Guatemalan male sport shooters
Olympic shooters of Guatemala
Shooters at the 1976 Summer Olympics
Place of birth missing (living people)